Garra fluviatilis is a species of cyprinid fish in the genus Garra endemic to the Khwae Noi River in Thailand.

References 

Garra
Fish described in 2016